Szabadegyháza is a village in Fejér county, Hungary.

Gallery

See also 
Hippolytpuszta

External links 

 Street map 

Populated places in Fejér County